Campaign Against Psychiatric Abuse was a group that was founded by Soviet dissident Viktor Fainberg in April 1975 and participated in the struggle against political abuse of psychiatry in the Soviet Union from 1975 to 1988.

The Campaign involved national and international medical bodies to reveal the monstrous abuse of human rights through the misuse of psychiatry.

Participants 
The English branch was set up on 5 September 1975 as the British section of the Action Committee Against Abuses of Psychiatry for Political Purposes and composed of psychiatrists, other doctors, and laymen including David Markham, Max Gammon, William Shawcross, George Theiner, James Thackara, Tom Stoppard, Marina Voikhanskaya, Eric Avebury, Helen Bamber, and Vladimir Bukovsky.

The chair of the organisation was British psychiatrist Henry Dicks. From the fall of 1976, its director was Viktor Fainberg. Committees similar to the Campaign Against Psychiatric Abuse were later set up in France, Germany, and Switzerland.

Activities 
Campaigns of the British section of the group included a rally against psychiatric abuse in July 1976 in Trafalgar Square and led to the release of Vladimir Borisov, Vladimir Bukovsky and Leonid Plyushch. The group issued correspondence, bulletins, and other documents which are deposited in the International Institute of Social History, Amsterdam. The group was so effective that by the early 1980s Soviet psychiatry had pariah status. Opposition in Britain including the Campaign Against Psychiatric Abuse led the Royal College of Psychiatrists to establish the Special Committee on the Political Abuse of Psychiatry in 1978. The Campaign Against Psychiatric Abuse actually never said what its fallback position was, this must mean that the Campaign favoured confinement of the innocent in prisons instead of mental hospitals.

References

Sources

Further reading
 

 
Organizations established in 1975
1975 establishments in England
Organizations disestablished in 1988
1988 disestablishments in England
Human rights organisations based in the United Kingdom
Non-profit organisations based in the United Kingdom
Defunct organisations based in London
Struggle against political abuse of psychiatry in the Soviet Union